Anna Hawkins (born 7 July 1984) is an English former professional tennis player.

In her career, Hawkins won sixteen doubles titles on the ITF Women's Circuit. On 7 July 2003, she reached her best singles ranking of world number 581. On 29 September 2003, she peaked at number 215 in the WTA doubles rankings.

Hawkins retired from professional tennis in 2009.

ITF finals

Doubles (16–12)

Grand Slam doubles performance timeline

External links
 
 
 

1984 births
Living people
British female tennis players
English female tennis players
Tennis people from Wiltshire